was one of four principal naval shipyards owned and operated by the Imperial Japanese Navy.

History

The Kure Naval District was established at Kure, Hiroshima in 1889, as the second of the naval districts responsible for the defense of the Japanese home islands. Along with the establishment of the navy base, a ship repair facility was also constructed, initially by moving the equipment from the Onohama shipyards near Kobe. Construction was supervised by the French engineer Louis-Émile Bertin. The first warship constructed at Kure, Miyako, was launched in 1897. The "Kure Shipyards" were officially renamed the "Kure Naval Arsenal" in 1903.

Kure developed into one of the largest shipbuilding facilities in the Empire of Japan, capable of working with the largest vessels. The Arsenal included a major steel works (built with British assistance), and also facilities for producing naval artillery and projectiles. The battleships Yamato and Nagato were designed and constructed at Kure.

The facilities of the Kure Naval Arsenal were repeatedly bombed by the United States Navy and United States Army Air Forces during the Pacific War, and over 70% of its buildings and equipment was destroyed.

After the surrender of Japan in 1945, the Kure Naval Arsenal was turned over to civilian hands.

Current facilities
The extensive dry dock, ship building, repair and engineering facilities are now owned and operated by Japan Marine United, one of Japan's largest merchant marine and naval shipbuilders.

Examples of ships built at Kure Naval Arsenal

Battleships
Yamato, Yamato-class battleship 1941
Nagato, Nagato-class battleship 1920
Settsu, Kawachi-class battleship 1912

Battlecruiser/Armoured Cruiser 

Akagi, Amagi-class battlecruiser/Akagi-class aircraft carrier 1925
Ibuki, Ibuki-class battlecruiser 1909
Tsukuba, Tsukuba-class battlecruiser 1907

Aircraft Carriers

 Katsuragi, Unryū-class aircraft carrier 1945 
 Fleet Carrier Sōryū, 1937
 Un'yō, Taiyō-class escort carrier 1942

Cruisers
 1 of 4  heavy cruisers: Atago (1932)
 1 of 4  heavy cruisers: Nachi (1928)
 light cruiser Ōyodo (1943)

Destroyers
 Ariake, Fubuki, Arare, Harusame-class Destroyers 1905

Submarines
 I-400-class submarine 
 I-201-class submarine

Seaplane Tenders
 Chitose, Chitose-class seaplane tender 1936
 Chiyoda, Chitose-class seaplane tender 1937

Naval Weapons designed at Kure

Naval Gun
 40(46) cm/45 Type 94 naval gun, main armament of the Yamato-class Battleship
 10 cm/65 Type 98 naval gun, main armament of the Akizuki-class Destroyer and Secondary armament of  light cruiser Ōyodo and aircraft carrier Taihō

See also

Bombing of Kure (July 1945)

References

Imperial Japanese Navy
Shipbuilding companies of Japan
Defunct companies of Japan
Shipyards building World War II warships